The 2020–21 Welsh League Cup (known for sponsorship purposes as The Nathaniel MG Cup) was the 29th season of the Welsh League cup competition, which was established in 1992.  The reigning champions were Connah's Quay Nomads. The competition was suspended in December 2020, before being cancelled in March 2021.

Format 

44 clubs  in the JD Cymru Premier, JD Cymru North & JD Cymru South Leagues will  enter the season's League Cup.
 Newport County and Cardiff  City were afforded the two wildcard spots for the season.
Due to Welsh Government  Regulations, only clubs from Tiers 1 & 2 of the Welsh Domestic Pyramid  were eligible to participate.
In the first round, the  wildcard entrants were both placed in the Southern section of the draw and  joined 13 JD Cymru South teams, and Penrhyncoch from the JD Cymru North,  whilst the Northern Section comprised twelve teams for JD Cymru North.
The top two unpromoted teams from the Tier 2 leagues last season, the 2 relegated JD Cymru Premier Clubs  and the 12 teams currently playing in Tier 1 will join the competition in the  Second Round later in 2021.

Access List

First round

North

South

Competition Cancelled 
On 31 March 2021, The Football Association of Wales National Cup Board (NCB) decided to cancel the rest of the Nathaniel MG Cup competition for the 2020–21 season. 

The decision to cancel the competition was made as the ongoing public health crisis has made it impossible to make playing the rest of the competition viable.

References
 

Welsh League Cup seasons
2020–21 in Welsh football
Wales
Welsh League Cup, 2020-21